Osin is a surname. Notable people with the surname include:

Denis Osin, American mathematician
Roman Osin (born 1961), British cinematographer